The Gilgit-Baltistan United Movement (GBUM) is a political movement of Gilgit-Baltistan based in Skardu, Pakistan. It demands a fully autonomous state consisting of Gilgit and Baltistan, formerly known as the Northern Areas.

The GBUM states that the Gilgit-Baltistan regions, formerly known as the Northern Areas, should be denoted "Gilgit-Baltistan" and that the Northern Areas Legislative Council should be given the status of an "Independent Constitutional  Assembly" and given similar rights granted to the existing Azad Kashmir Legislative Assembly.

Claim to recover a past independence

According to the GBUM, the region enjoyed a brief period of independence between November 1, 1947, when the suzerainty of the Dogra rulers of the Kashmir princely state ceased to exist, and November 16, 1947, when the Pakistani tribal forces and Pakistani Army soldiers invaded the region. According to British Major William Brown, there was a secret plan among the Gilgit Scouts to set up a "Republic of Gilgit-Astor" when they ousted the armed forces of the Maharajah of Kashmir's armed forces on November 1, 1947.

Gilgit–Baltistan National Alliance (GBNA)
Before the GBUM, there was a Gilgit-Baltistan National Alliance (GBNA), promoting the same claims, together with the Balawaristan National Front (claiming the independence of a larger political entity, Balawaristan).

References

External links
 Discord in Pakistan’s Northern Areas, Asia Report N°131 (International Crisis Group), 2 April 2007

Politics of Gilgit-Baltistan
Political parties in Pakistan
Pro-independence parties
Separatism in Pakistan